Penny on M.A.R.S. is an English-language teen dramedy series of the Walt Disney Company that is produced in Italy. The series is a spin-off of the Italian series Alex & Co.

Series overview

Episodes 

 All episodes were directed by Claudio Norza unless otherwise noted.

Season 1 (2018)

Season 2 (2019)

Season 3 (2020)

References 

Lists of Disney Channel television series episodes
Lists of Italian television series episodes